Pal-o-Mine is a chocolate bar which consists of a peanut fudge middle covered in dark chocolate. The standard  package includes two pieces. It is produced by Ganong in New Brunswick, Canada. Ganong temporarily halted the production of the bar in 2021 to enhance the formula. This was done so that the product could run on a new piece of equipment installed at the factory. However, when the bar reappeared on the shelves in 2022, some consumers voiced their displeasure with the new formula.

History
Arthur Ganong used to go fishing with Ganong chocolatier George Ensor, and they would take chunks of chocolate along in their pockets. However, they found that the chocolate would melt in their pockets and make a mess, so they wrapped bars of chocolate in cellophane. In 1898, Ganong started selling individually-wrapped chocolate bars, the first company to do so in North America. In 1910, Ganong added nuts to their chocolate bars, and they started using the name "Pal-o-Mine" in 1920. (According to one version of the story, Ganong and Ensor would give the leftover chocolate to local children, and one girl would say "you’re a Pal of mine" every time she got some.) Pal-o-Mine became Ganong's longest-lasting chocolate bar brand. It is recognized for being the oldest, continuously-produced chocolate bar in North America.

References

Ganong family
Chocolate bars
Canadian confectionery